Urban Connection is a Norwegian Jazz trio, awarded the title of “Young Jazz Musicians of the Year” in 1998, at Norway’s prestigious Molde International Jazz Festival, forerunner of today's Jazz Intro Award, and has since appeared at numerous clubs and festivals, both at home and abroad.

Biography 
Urban Connection have been touring under the auspices of the Moldejazz, where they visited several of the major festivals in Europe, like the Montreaux Jazz Festival, the North Sea Jazz Festival in Rotterdam, and the Istanbul Jazz Festival amongst others, as well as being Norway's contribution EBU Festival in the Czech and Norwegian jazz forums envoys to the jazz festival in the Faroe Islands.

They released their first album Urban Connection (April 15, 2001), awarded Spellemannprisen 2001 as best Jazz record of the year. For their next album French Only (March 23, 2002), they had a release concert at the Ole Bull Academy in Voss, during the Vossajazz Festival 2002. A third album UC 3 (December 13, 2005) was released in 2005, combined with extensive international tours including in England, Canada, Japan, China, Nepal, South Africa and the Baltic countries.

Tomas Lauvland Pettersen of the Norwegian jazz magazine Ballade states:

... Their take on modern Konitzesque jazz is highly integral and utterly convincing on their third full-length outing UC 3. Bassist Raknes is not only able to swing and solo, he writes strong tunes with challenging harmonic and rhythmic twists that keep the listener on his toes throughout the recording...

Urban connection received rave reviews for their latest concerts, on Vossajazz and at Victoria - Nasjonal jazzscene in 2012.

Personnel

Honors 
Young Jazz Musicians of the Year, 1998 at Moldejazz
Spellemannprisen 2001 in the class Jazz, for the album Urban Connection (2001)

Discography

2001: Urban Connection (Bergland Productions)
2002: French Only (Bergland Productions)
2004: UC 3 (Bergland Productions)

See also

Notes and references

External links

 
 Bergland Productions site
 MIC Profile (Norwegian)

1996 establishments in Norway
Musical groups established in 1996
Musical groups from Trondheim
Norwegian jazz ensembles
Norwegian musical trios
Spellemannprisen winners